Environment and Urbanization ASIA is a peer reviewed journal which provides information in the fields of urbanization, human settlements and the environment across Asia. It is published twice a year by SAGE Publications in association with National Institute of Urban Affairs. Its audience includes researchers, academicians, policy-makers, non-governmental organizations (NGOs), activists and students particularly in Asia.

Abstracting and indexing 
 Environment and Urbanization Asia is abstracted and indexed in:
 International Bibliography of the Social Sciences 
 SCOPUS
 DeepDyve
 Dutch-KB
 Pro-Quest-RSP
 EBSCO
 OCLC
 ICI
 J-Gate

References
 http://www.niua.org/environment-and-urbanization-asia

External links
 
 Homepage
SAGE Publishing academic journals
Urban planning
Environmental studies
Publications established in 2010